Flad may refer to:

Flad Architects, American architectural firm
Egon Flad, German soccer player and sports agent
Henry Flad, German civil engineer
Flad (lagoon), A stage in the formation of a Gloe lake